United Nations Security Council Resolution 17, adopted on February 10, 1947, decided that the commission created by United Nations Security Council Resolution 15 was not empowered to request the governments of Greece, Albania, Bulgaria or Yugoslavia to postpone the executions of any of their political prisoners unless could give witness that would assist the commission in its task.

The resolution was adopted by 9 votes, with 2 abstentions from Poland and the Soviet Union.

See also
List of United Nations Security Council Resolutions 1 to 100 (1946–1953)

References
Text of the Resolution at undocs.org

External links
 

 0017
1947 in Yugoslavia
 0017
 0017
 0017
 0017
1947 in Albania
1947 in Greece
1947 in Bulgaria
February 1947 events